Jornal A Tarde,  widely known as A Tarde, is a daily newspaper published in Bahia, Brazil. The paper was founded by the journalist and politician  on 15 October 1912. It is currently the oldest circulating newspaper of Bahia, and the largest of the Brazilian regions North and Northeast.

Its headquarters is located at the Professor Milton Cayres de Brito street, 204, Caminho das Árvores, in Salvador.

References

External links

  

1912 establishments in Brazil
Daily newspapers published in Brazil
Newspapers established in 1912
Portuguese-language newspapers
Companies based in Salvador, Bahia